Sergey Ivanov (born January 3, 1985) is a Russian former American football safety who was an international practice squad member for the Tampa Bay Buccaneers of the National Football League and expert at Russian television about NFL games. He was also a member of the Berlin Thunder and Amsterdam Admirals of NFL Europe.

References

External links
Tampa Bay Buccaneers bio
Just Sports Stats

1985 births
Living people
Sportspeople from Moscow
American football safeties
Russian emigrants to the United States
Berlin Thunder players
Amsterdam Admirals players
Tampa Bay Buccaneers players
Russian players of American football